The 1992 Tajik League was the inaugural season of the Tajik League, the top division of Tajikistan football.

Teams

Table

Season statistics

Top scorers

References

External links
Season at RSSSF

Tajikistan Higher League seasons
1
Tajik
Tajik